ScientificPython is an open source library of scientific tools for the Python programming language. Its development started in 1995.

It has not been updated since October 1, 2014.

The library includes
 mathematical tools like
 Differentiation for functions of any number of variables up to any order
 Numerical integration using the Romberg algorithm
 Newton–Raphson for numerical root finding
 Non-linear least squares fitting
 support for parallel computing
 Bulk synchronous parallel
 Message Passing Interface
 and several input/output interfaces, notably with
 NetCDF files
 Protein Data Bank files
 Fortran-compatible text formatting
 VRML for 3D visualizations
Qt and Tk widget toolkits are provided for building cross-platform graphical user interfaces.

ScientificPython is released under the CeCILL.

The main developer and maintainer of ScientificPython is Konrad Hinsen of Orléans University who uses it as a building block for his own research code, in particular the molecular modeling toolkit MMTK and the software nMoldyn that uses molecular dynamics trajectories to predict neutron scattering spectra. Outside this particular application context, most users are likely to prefer the package SciPy, which has seen a more dynamic evolution in the decade 2000–2010, involving several active developers.

See also 
 List of numerical-analysis software

References

External links 
 

Free science software
Numerical programming languages
Python (programming language) scientific libraries